David Pickering is a reference books compiler. He has contributed to (and often been sole author and editor of) some 150 reference books, mostly in the areas of the arts, language, local history and popular interest. These include a Dictionary of Theatre (1988), an Encyclopedia of Pantomime (1993), Brewer's Twentieth-Century Music (1994; 1997), a Dictionary of Superstitions (1995) and a Dictionary of Witchcraft (1996).

He lives in Buckingham with his wife and two sons. Pickering was a pupil at Dryden House, Oundle School.  He graduated in English from St Peter's College, Oxford.

Dictionary of the Theatre (1988)
Dictionary of the Theatre, edited by Pickering and published by Sphere in 1988, is intended to be a comprehensive dictionary of important plays and figures in the history of theatre. Derek Paget, writing in New Theatre Quarterly in 1990, wrote that the Dictionary was "likely to be of great use as reference (and as a first line of inquiry) to a wide range of people".

Bibliography
 
 
 
 
 
 
 
 
 
 
 
 
 
 
 
 
 
 
Review, by Rosenthal, Marilyn, Library Journal. 1/1/2002, Vol. 127 Issue 1, p88-89
Review, by Bibel, Barbara and Quinn, Mary Ellen Booklist. 02/01/98, Vol. 94 Issue 11, p934. 2p.

References

1958 births
Living people
People educated at Oundle School
English non-fiction writers
Alumni of St Peter's College, Oxford
People from Buckingham
English male non-fiction writers